Ivan Brkić (15 January 1960 – 5 September 2015) was a Croatian actor. He appeared in more than forty films from 1988 to 2015.

Selected filmography

References

External links 

1960 births
2015 deaths
Croatian male film actors